The 940s BC is a decade which lasted from 949 BC to 940 BC.

Events and trends
 949 BC Mahaparinirvana of the historical Buddha Shakyamuni Siddharta, according to far eastern schools of Buddhism.
 947 BC—Death of Zhou mo wang, King of the Zhou Dynasty of China.
 946 BC—Zhou gong wang becomes King of the Zhou Dynasty of China.
 945 BC—Egypt: Psusennes III dies, the last king of the Twenty-first Dynasty. Shoshenq I succeeds him, the founder of the Twenty-second Dynasty.
 940 BC—The Temple of Solomon was finished being built.

Significant people
 Adad-nirari II, king of Assyria, is born (approximate date).
 Nadab, king of Israel, is born (approximate date).
 Abijah, king of Judah, is born (approximate date).
 Asa, king of Judah, is born (approximate date).

References 

 

es:Años 940 a. C.